Berezivka is a city and administrative center of the Berezivka Raion in Odesa Oblast, Ukraine. It hosts the administration of Berezivka urban hromada, one of the hromadas of Ukraine. In 2001, population was 9,481. Current estimated population:

References

External links
 

Cities in Odesa Oblast
Kherson Governorate
Cities of district significance in Ukraine
Populated places established in the Russian Empire
1802 establishments in the Russian Empire
Berezivka Raion